Dolna Čarlija is a village in the municipality of Mogila, North Macedonia.

Demographics
According to the 2002 census, the village had a total of 198 inhabitants. Ethnic groups in the village include:

Macedonians 197
Serbs 1

References

Villages in Mogila Municipality